Nyumashiwa (population 3,400) is the second largest city on the Comorian island of Mohéli, after Fomboni, the capital. It is located in the southern part of the island; it is known because of the islets which are in front of the city and which are called the islets of Nyumashiwa. There are eight of them. Some of them have the most beautiful white sand beaches on the island.

The islets of Nyumashiwa 
 
The islets of Nyumashiwa that are located off the southern coast of Mohéli are the largest and best known. Their names all begin with  shisiwa  which means  island . They all have the same massive appearance. 

Populated places in Mohéli